The F21 is a heavy-weight torpedo developed by DCNS for the French Navy to replace the F17 torpedo. 

It is designed to neutralize enemy ships and submarines and capable of operating in deep waters and near coastal areas with high levels of noise and dense shipping.

It is planned to gradually equip all French submarines, starting in 2018. The contract includes the development and delivery of about one hundred F21 torpedoes and their integration into French submarines.  Naval Group delivered a batch of six torpedoes to the French Navy in November 2019. It has also been selected for the Brazilian Navy with the first batch handed over in January 2020.

Characteristics

History

Concept
The F21 was to be a development version of the Italian Black Shark torpedo. In 2008 France signed a development contract for 93 heavy torpedoes for its nuclear submarines, to be delivered from 2015. The original plan called for a derivative of the Black Shark to be built by a joint venture between DCNS, Thales and WASS, but they fell out and DCNS will now be developing the F21 Artemis with Thales and Atlas Electronic.

Qualification
The F21 was first tested on DCNS's Pégase catamaran in February 2013 and a submarine launch was planned for 2014, with production deliveries scheduled to start in late 2015. Qualification testing began in 2016, and were completed in June 2017 off the coast of Var.

See also 
 MU90 Impact
 American 21 inch torpedo
 Futlyar
 DM2A4
 Black Shark
 Mark 48 torpedo
 Spearfish
 Tigerfish
 Baek Sang Eo (White Shark)
 Type 89 torpedo
 Type 65 torpedo
 Yu-6 torpedo
 Torpedo 62
 Varunastra (torpedo)

References

Torpedoes
Naval weapons of France